Moritzburg is a municipality in the district of Meissen in Saxony, Germany, between Meissen itself, an early centre of Saxony, and today's capital Dresden. It is most famous for its Baroque castle, Schloss Moritzburg.

The village, which was originally known as Eisenburg, was first mentioned in 1294. It became a market in 1675. The Saxon state stud has been located here since 1828. In 1884, a narrow gauge railway, the Radebeul-Radeburg line, was built connecting the town to the district capital Radebeul and Radeburg. It was renamed Moritzburg, after the nearby castle, in 1934. The German sculptress and graphic artist Käthe Kollwitz lived at the invitation of Prince Ernst Heinrich von Wettin in the Rüdenhof in Moritzburg from 1944 until her death on 22 April 1945. In 1995, a small museum was opened in the Rüdenhof.

Twin towns
 Cochem, Germany.

Personalities

Sons of the place
Albert Casimir, Duke of Teschen (1738-1822), artistic patron
Martin Dulig, Minister of State in Saxony

Other personalities associated with the place
Maurice, Elector of Saxony (1521-1553), Elector
Augustus II the Strong (1670-1733), Elector of Saxony, King of Poland
Frederick Augustus I of Saxony (1750-1827), first king of Saxony
Käthe Kollwitz (1867-1945), sculptress and graphic artist
Prince Ernst Heinrich of Saxony (1896-1971), Wettiner
Jan Vogler (born 1964), cellist and artistic director of the Moritzburg Festival

References

External links

Meissen (district)